The 2014 UWW World Wrestling Championships were the 10th edition of World Wrestling Championships of combined events and were held from September 8 to 14 in Tashkent, Uzbekistan.

Medal table

Team ranking

Medal summary

Men's freestyle

Men's Greco-Roman

Women's freestyle

Participating nations
692 competitors from 81 nations participated.

 (2)
 (2)
 (3)
 (14)
 (8)
 (22)
 (23)
 (5)
 (18)
 (1)
 (14)
 (1)
 (23)
 (5)
 (5)
 (7)
 (7)
 (2)
 (5)
 (8)
 (1)
 (3)
 (6)
 (9)
 (16)
 (18)
 (1)
 (10)
 (1)
 (1)
 (3)
 (16)
 (24)
 (3)
 (16)
 (1)
 (4)
 (8)
 (1)
 (24)
 (24)
 (12)
 (7)
 (5)
 (3)
 (1)
 (1)
 (13)
 (14)
 (1)
 (16)
 (1)
 (1)
 (1)
 (1)
 (5)
 (4)
 (1)
 (17)
 (2)
 (3)
 (1)
 (13)
 (24)
 (3)
 (6)
 (7)
 (1)
 (1)
 (19)
 (8)
 (12)
 (3)
 (7)
 (2)
 (21)
 (9)
 (24)
 (24)
 (24)
 (9)

References 

 Results Book

External links 
 Wrestling Database
 2014 World Championships Special Section on USA Wrestling

 
World Wrestling Championships
FILA Wrestling World Championships
World Wrestling Championships
World Wrestling Championships
Sport in Tashkent
International wrestling competitions hosted by Uzbekistan
21st century in Tashkent